Time Expired is a 1992 short film directed by Danny Leiner and starring Bob Gosse, Edie Falco and John Leguizamo.

References

External links

1992 films
American short films
Films directed by Danny Leiner
1990s English-language films